Deutschkreutz ( until 1899, Németkeresztúr  ) is an Austrian market town in the district of Oberpullendorf in the state of Burgenland.

Geography 
Deutschkreutz lies in Middle Burgenland. It is divided into the districts of Deutschkreutz and Girm. The town, like its neighbors Unterpetersdorf, Horitschon, and Neckenmarkt, is located in Blaufränkischland.

History 
Deutschkreutz has been a market town since 1340 (no documention 1370-1429). The town belonged to Hungary as part of Sopron County until 1920. After the end of World War I, the territory was given to Austria by the Treaties of St. Germain and Trianon. Since 1921, the town has belonged to the newly founded State of Burgenland.

In Jewish history, Deutschkreutz was one of the Seven Communities of Burgenland.

Population

Politics 
Deutschkreutz's mayor is Manfred Kölly who was expelled from the FPÖ in December 2006. Vice mayors are Mag. Robert Friedl of the SPÖ and Paul Fennes of the ÖVP. Its chief officer is Stefan Schöller.

The mandate assignments in the Municipal Council (23 seats) are SPÖ 11, ÖVP 7, FPÖ 5, Grüne 0, and other lists 0.

Climate

Personalities
 Elizabeth Báthory
 Lajos Dóczi

See also 

 The Unprecedented Defence of the Fortress Deutschkreuz

References 

 The information in this article is based on a translation of its German equivalent.

Cities and towns in Oberpullendorf District
Siebengemeinden